Mount Tammany is the southernmost peak of the Kittatinny Mountains, in Knowlton Township, Warren County, New Jersey, United States. Across the Gap is Mount Minsi, on the Pennsylvania side of the river. The mountain is named after the Lenni Lenape chief Tamanend. It lies along the Appalachian Trail in Worthington State Forest. The summit can be hiked by the Mount Tammany Trail ascending the western slopes. The trailhead is accessible from Interstate 80.

Trails and hiking 
Hiking on Mount Tammany consists of two trails. The red dot trail and the blue dot trail. The red dot trail is 1.2 miles and the blue dot trail is 1.8 miles. Combining the two for one of NJ's most popular hikes is a 3 mile loop. There is a 1201 feet elevation change going up and down the mountain. Generally, this is considered a challenging trail with an average completion time of 2 hours 20 minutes. Climbing up the trail also requires bouldering and physical climbing at some points along the trail. Recommended equipment, comfortable, active footwear, water, appropriate clothing for physical activity. For more information including a detailed analysis of the hike itself, please visit these links below where experienced hikers provide their insight.

https://www.njhiking.com/mt-tammany/ - complete overview and insight on the hike, including photos, tips, and scenic viewpoint locations
https://www.alltrails.com/trail/us/new-jersey/mount-tammany-red-dot-and-blue-dot-loop-trail - trusted source by most experienced hikers for trail conditions and overview.
https://www.nps.gov/dewa/planyourvisit/red-dot-trail.htm - National Park Service website for up to date closures, alerts, and events for the mountain.

References

External links
 Mount Tammany

Mountains of New Jersey
Kittatinny Mountains
Mountains of Warren County, New Jersey
Knowlton Township, New Jersey